The Amu-Darya stone loach (Nemacheilus oxianus) is a species of ray-finned fish in the genus Nemacheilus, although it is sometimes placed in the genus Oxynoemacheilus.

Footnotes 
 

Nemacheilidae
Fish described in 1877